Lebanon participated in the 2010 Summer Youth Olympics in Singapore.

Medalists

Fencing

Group Stage

Knock-Out Stage

Judo

Individual

Team

Swimming

Taekwondo

Michel Samaha qualified for the 2010 Youth Olympic Games by getting 5th place at the World qualifications in Tijuana, Mexico.

Samaha defeated the player from Suriname that had won against the player from Azerbaijan (ranked 6th at the World Qualifications).
Samaha reached the semi final and secured the BRONZE medal then lost against the player from Russia.

Samaha brought back to Lebanon the 1st Olympic medal since 1980.

References

External links
Competitors List: Lebanon

2010 in Lebanese sport
Nations at the 2010 Summer Youth Olympics
Lebanon at the Youth Olympics